The Asia Pacific Baptist Federation (APBF) is a regional organization of the Baptist World Alliance, a worldwide fellowship of churches that subscribe to Baptist distinctives. The APBF was formed in the then British colony of Hong Kong in 1973 as the Asian Baptist Federation (ABF). It adopted its current name in 2007 after a resolution was approved during the ABF Congress held in the city of Chiang Mai, Thailand from 2 May to 6 May 2007.

History

One of the earliest Protestant missionaries to Asia was an English Baptist named William Carey who was one of the founders of the Particular Baptist Society for Propagating the Gospel among the Heathen (today known as BMS World Mission) in 1792. He started his work in the Dutch controlled Serampore north of Calcutta, India in 1793, initially focussing on Bible translation, preaching, teaching, and the founding of schools. One of the major schools established by this mission is Serampore College, founded in 1818.

Other pioneers include Joshua Marshman and William Ward who together with Carey became known as the Serampore Trio. Of the three, Ward was instrumental in converting American Congregationalist missionary, Adoniram Judson, to Baptist beliefs and baptised both Judson and his wife, Ann Haseltine Judson, in Serampore.

Judson later began Baptist missionary work in Burma on 13 July 1813 upon his arrival in Rangoon. Today most countries in Asia have Baptist believers and churches.

Organization 

The APBF represents almost 60 Baptist denominations (known as conventions or unions) from 20 different countries, encompassing almost 30,000 congregations with more than 5 million baptized believers. The single largest member of the APBF is the Myanmar Baptist Convention which claims more than 1.1 million baptized believers.

The principal officers of the APBF are:

Ministries 

 Mission & Evangelism
 Chaired by Tim Hyunmo Lee of South Korea, the Mission & Evangelism committee organizes consultations and encourages partnership within member bodies.

 APBF Communications
 Chaired by Bijoy A. Sangma of India, ABPF Communications seeks to improve the network of Baptist within Asia by sharing news and information about the work of member bodies. It publishes the quarterly APBF Digest and manages the online presence of the APBF.

 APB Aid (Relief & Development)
 Chaired by Les Fussell of Australia, the Relief & Development committee mobilizes resources to support member bodies in responding to calamities and providing development aid.

 Theological Education
 Chaired by Miyun Chung of South Korea, the Theological Education committee provides the infrastructure for fellowship and partnership between the more than 50 Baptist theological colleges and seminaries in Asia.

 Asia Baptist Peace Network
 Chaired by Alan Marr of Australia, the Asia Baptist Peace Network seeks to be involved in conflict resolution and training Baptists for peace making.

 Co-opted Members in the APBF Executive Committee
 Makoto Kato from Japan and John Kok from Malaysia.

 Asian Baptist Youth Fellowship
 Chaired by Vesekhoyi Tetseo of Japan, the Asia Pacific Baptist Youth Fellowship conducts training programme and conferences at sub-regional and region wide levels including a major youth conference once in four years.

 Asian Baptist Women's Union
 Chaired by Precey Caronangan of the Philippines, the Asian Baptist Women's Union conducts training programmes for women leaders and hosts a major regional level conference once in five years.

 Baptist Women's Union of the South West Pacific
 Chaired by Sue Peters of Australia, the Baptist Women's Union of the South West Pacific networks as a resource body for women's ministries across the South West Pacific, encourages and supports women leaders and hosts a major regional conference every five years.

 Asian Baptist Men's Department
 Led by a team of dedicated lay people, the Asian Baptist Men's Department seeks to reach out to Baptist men and involve them in ministry and also improve the quality of their faith so as to impact society.

Members 

As of 1 February 2011, 57 conventions and unions are represented in the APBF:

See also 

 Baptist World Alliance

References

External links 
 Asia Pacific Baptist Federation

Christian organizations established in 1973
Baptist denominations in Asia
Baptist denominations established in the 20th century